Kiss the Rain could refer to:

 Kiss the Rain, a song by British singer Billie Myers
 Kiss the Rain (FEMM song), a song by Japanese duo FEMM
 "Kiss the Rain", a piano piece from the album From the Yellow Room by composer and pianist Yiruma